General Gaston Reinig (born 17 November 1956 in Diekirch) is a Luxembourgian soldier and a former Chief of Defence of the Luxembourg Army.  He replaced Nico Ries in 2008, having previously been Commander of the Military Training Centre in his hometown of Diekirch.  He was promoted to general in March 2008: the first Chief of Defence to hold the rank.

References

Luxembourgian soldiers
1956 births
Living people
People from Diekirch
Recipients of the Cross of the Order of Merit of the Federal Republic of Germany